Bleu d'Auvergne is a French blue cheese, named for its place of origin in the Auvergne region of south-central France. It is made from cow's milk, and is one of the cheeses granted the Appellation d'origine contrôlée from the French government.

Bleu d'Auvergne was developed in the mid-1850s by a French cheesemaker named Antoine Roussel. Roussel noted that the occurrence of blue molds on his curd resulted in an agreeable taste, and conducted experiments to determine how veins of such mold could be induced. After several failed tests, Roussel discovered that the application of rye bread mold created the veining, and that pricking the curd with a needle provided increased aeration. The increased oxygenation enabled the blue mold to grow in the pockets of air within the curd. Subsequently, his discovery and techniques spread throughout the region.

Today, bleu d'Auvergne is prepared via mechanical needling processes. It is then aged for approximately four weeks in cool, wet cellars before distribution, a relatively short period for blue cheeses.

Properties and uses
Bleu d'Auvergne has a strong and pungent taste, but to a lesser extent than other blue cheeses; it is less salted, with a creamier and more buttery taste and a moister texture. Some versions use a weaker form of mold, Penicillium glaucum, to create the blue veins, rather than the Penicillium roqueforti used in Roquefort and other blue cheeses.

Bleu d'Auvergne is often used in salad dressings and pasta seasonings, and it is also a good cheese for snacking. It has been stated that it pairs well with sweet wines such as dessert-style riesling and sauvignon blanc or strong, robust red wines, as well as rich, dark beer such as English barley wine or American porter, which have both the sweetness and bold flavor required to balance the cheese.

See also
 List of cheeses

References

External links

French cheeses
Occitan cheeses
French products with protected designation of origin
Cow's-milk cheeses
Blue cheeses